The 1985 Masters (officially the 1985 Benson & Hedges Masters) was a professional non-ranking snooker tournament that took place between 27 January and 3 February 1985 at the Wembley Conference Centre in London, England. The highest break of the tournament was 103 made by Cliff Thorburn, for which Thorburn earned £3,750.

The top 16 ranked players took part in the competition. The first round match between Alex Higgins and Steve Davis on 30 January turned out to be one of the all-time greatest matches between the pair when Higgins won 5–4 in front of an ecstatic Wembley crowd. The final on 3 February gave Cliff Thorburn his second Masters title defeating Doug Mountjoy 9–6 in the final, and he became the second player to win two Masters titles.

Field
Defending champion Jimmy White was the number 1 seed with World Champion Steve Davis seeded 2. The remaining places were allocated to the top 16 players in the world rankings. Willie Thorne was making his debut in the Masters.

Main draw

Final

Century breaks
Total: 1
 103  Cliff Thorburn

References 

Masters (snooker)
Masters (snooker)
Masters Snooker
Masters (Snooker)
Masters (Snooker)